The 2009 SEC Championship Game was played on December 5, 2009, in the Georgia Dome in Atlanta, Georgia, to determine the 2009 football champion of the Southeastern Conference (SEC).  The game featured the Florida Gators and the Alabama Crimson Tide.  The Crimson Tide was the designated "home team"; this home team, chosen on an alternating basis, was 2–4 in SEC Championship Games.  The winner was all but assured to go on to play for a National Championship, in a likely matchup with the Texas Longhorns provided Texas won in the Big 12 Championship Game versus the north division champion Nebraska Cornhuskers.  Entering the 2009 contest, the SEC East was 11–6 in SEC Championship games, with the Florida Gators accounting for seven of the eleven victories.  Before the 2009 game, Alabama represented the SEC West six times in the conference championship game, compiling a 2–4 record, and had faced the Gators in all six of their previous SEC Championship game appearances.  This was the first and so far the only time any conference championship game had featured two undefeated teams and was also the first time an AP Poll No. 1 played a No. 2 outside of the BCS Championship Game since the top-ranked Ohio State beat the second-ranked Michigan during the 2006 regular season.

The game began at 4:00 p.m. EST and was televised by CBS Sports, for the ninth straight season.  The game was also streamed online at CBSSports.com and on mobile for customers subscribing to the MediaFLO service on CBS Sports Mobile.

Alabama defeated Florida 32–13 and as expected secured a berth to the 2010 BCS National Championship Game where they would go on to defeat Texas. This game is often considered the moment when the Alabama dynasty began in earnest after a disappointing 2007 season and a loss to the same Tebow-led Gators in the 2008 SEC Championship.

Scoring summary

Uniforms
Alabama wore its standard home uniform, while Florida wore an all-white combination of its Nike Pro Combat helmet and its usual white uniform.

See also
 Alabama–Florida football rivalry

References

SEC Championship
SEC Championship Game
Alabama Crimson Tide football games
Florida Gators football games
SEC Championship Game
SEC Championship Game
SEC Championship Game